Gustave Cabaret (1 November 1866 – 4 April 1918) was a French archer.  He competed at the 1908 Summer Olympics in London. Cabaret entered the men's double York round event in 1908, taking 26th place with 191 points. That last-place finish was not repeated in the second event of the men's archery competitions in 1908.  Cabaret won the bronze medal in the Continental style, scoring 255 points to finish 8 behind Eugène Grisot and only 1 behind Louis Vernet.

References

Sources

External links
Gustave Cabaret on databaseOlympics.com
Gustave Cabaret's profile at Sports Reference.com

1866 births
1918 deaths
Archers at the 1908 Summer Olympics
Olympic archers of France
French male archers
Olympic bronze medalists for France
Olympic medalists in archery
Medalists at the 1908 Summer Olympics